Wollner Building is a historic commercial building located at Lewistown, Mifflin County, Pennsylvania, on Monument Square across from the Mifflin County Courthouse.  It was built in 1906, and is a three-story, vernacular brick building with a chamfered corner measuring approximately 30 feet by 90 feet.  It sits on a rusticated stone base and has three wood storefronts. Its significance lies in its architecture, its connection with the urbanization of Lewistown, and its association with Calvin Greene, a prominent local businessman and founder of the Lewistown Trust Company, which was housed there for many years. Many locals remember the ground floor as Headings Drug Store. It was there into the 1960s. Currently, the building houses the Seven Mountains Medical Center on the first floor with private apartments on the second and third floors.

It was added to the National Register of Historic Places in 1984.

References

Commercial buildings on the National Register of Historic Places in Pennsylvania
Commercial buildings completed in 1906
Buildings and structures in Mifflin County, Pennsylvania
National Register of Historic Places in Mifflin County, Pennsylvania
1906 establishments in Pennsylvania